La Font d'en Fargues is a neighborhood in the Horta-Guinardó district of Barcelona, Catalonia (Spain).

Font d'en Fargues
Font d'en Fargues